The 36th General Assembly of Nova Scotia represented Nova Scotia between 1916 and 1920.

The Liberal Party led by George Henry Murray formed the government.

James F. Ellis was speaker in 1916. Robert Irwin was named speaker in 1917 because Ellis was serving overseas.

The assembly was dissolved on June 28, 1920.

List of Members 

Notes:

References 
 

Terms of the General Assembly of Nova Scotia
1916 establishments in Nova Scotia
1920 disestablishments in Nova Scotia
20th century in Nova Scotia